The 1987 Men's European Volleyball Championship was the fifteenth edition of the event, organized by Europe's governing volleyball body, the Confédération Européenne de Volleyball. It was hosted in Auderghem and Ghent, Belgium from September 25 to October 3, 1987.

Teams

Group A – Auderghem

 
 
 
 
 

Group B – Ghent

Preliminary round

Group A

Group B

Final round

Final ranking

References
 Results

Men's European Volleyball Championships
E
Volleyball Championship
V
Sports competitions in Ghent
Auderghem
20th century in Ghent
Men's European Volleyball Championship
Men's European Volleyball Championship